Forbidden fruit is a phrase that originates from the Book of Genesis concerning Adam and Eve.

Forbidden fruit may also refer to:

Commercial product
Forbidden Fruit (beer), a beer brewed by Hoegaarden Brewery in Flanders, Belgium
Forbidden Fruit (liqueur), a liqueur, with pomelo as one of the ingredients
An internet meme for the consumption of Tide Pods

Music

Albums 
Forbidden Fruit (Elegy album), or the title song
Forbidden Fruit (Marion Meadows album), or the title song
Forbidden Fruit (Nina Simone album), or the title song

Songs 
"Forbidden Fruit" (J. Cole song), featuring Kendrick Lamar
"Forbidden Fruit" (Noël Coward song)
"Forbidden Fruit", a song by The Band from their album Northern Lights – Southern Cross
"Forbidden Fruit", a song by The Blow Monkeys from their album Animal Magic
"Forbidden Fruit", a song by Jessica Simpson from her album In This Skin
"Forbidden Fruit", a song by Paul van Dyk from his album Seven Ways
"Forbidden Fruit", a song by The Pursuit of Happiness from their album One Sided Story
"Forbidden Fruit", a song by Roy Harper from his album Valentine
"Forbidden Fruit", a song by Toya Delazy from her album Ascension

Film
Forbidden Fruit, a 1915 film directed by Ivan Abramson
Forbidden Fruit (1921 film), directed by Cecil B. DeMille
Forbidden Fruit (1952 film), directed by Henri Verneuil
Forbidden Fruit (1953 film), a 1953 Mexican drama film
Forbidden Fruit (2000 film), directed by Sue Maluwa-Bruce, Beate Kunath and Yvonne Zückmantel
Forbidden Fruit (2009 film), directed by Dome Karukoski
Heart of Men, reissued as Forbidden Fruit, directed by Frank Rajah Arase

Television
"Forbidden Fruit" (American Horror Story)
"Forbidden Fruit" (CSI: NY episode)
"Forbidden Fruit" (Dead Zone)
"Forbidden Fruit" (Duckman)
"Forbidden Fruit" (Will & Grace)
The Forbidden Fruit, an Iranian drama
Yasak Elma, a Turkish romance/drama that translates to Forbidden Fruit

Literature
Forbidden Fruit: Selected Tales in Verse, Guido Walman's 1998 translation of selections from Jean de La Fontaine's Contes et nouvelles en vers (1665)
Forbidden Fruit, a 1992 anthology of erotica written by Filipina women
Forbidden Fruit, a 1954 science fiction novella by Edwin Charles Tubb

Fruit
Forbidden fruit (citrus), a citrus fruit variety native to Saint Lucia